The Embassy of Algeria in Kyiv is the diplomatic mission of Algeria in Ukraine, and its accreditation in Moldova.

History 
The People's Democratic Republic of Algeria recognized independence of Ukraine on December 27, 1991. On August 29, 1992, diplomatic relations between the two countries were established. In November 1992 the first Ambassador of Algeria Belramul Kamerzerman presented his credentials to the President of Ukraine Leonid Kravchuk. Algeria has an embassy in Kyiv and Ukraine has an embassy in Algiers (opened in 1999).

The embassy was temporarily closed on 6 March 2022 as a result of the 2022 Russian invasion of Ukraine.

List of Ambassadors
 Belramul Kamerzerman (1992-1997)
 Cherif Chikhi (1997-2004),
 Mokaddem Bafdal (2004-2010)
 Mohammed Bashir Mazzuz (2010-2015)
 Hocine Boussouara (2015–present)

See also 
 Algeria-Ukraine relations
 Foreign relations of Algeria
 Foreign relations of Ukraine
 Diplomatic missions in Ukraine
 Diplomatic missions of Algeria

References

External links 
 List of Algerian Embassies
 Ministry of Foreign Affairs of Ukraine
 Embassy of Algeria in Kyiv

Diplomatic missions in Kyiv
Kiev
Algeria–Ukraine relations